"Churchill's Black Dog" is a song written by Greg Arnold and recorded by Australian folk-rock band Things of Stone and Wood. The song was released in February 1995 as the second single from the band's second studio album Junk Theatre. "Churchill's Black Dog" peaked at number 34 on the ARIA Charts in March 1995.

Track listing

Charts

References

1994 songs
1995 singles
Things of Stone and Wood songs
Songs written by Greg Arnold